Walter A. Abbott (1899 – after 1921) was a footballer who played in the Football League for Grimsby Town.

Life and career
Abbott was born in Birmingham, England, in 1899. He was the son of England international footballer Walter Abbott.

Abbott made five appearances for Second Division club Grimsby Town in the 1919–20 season. He failed to score for the first team, but succeeded for the reserves, playing in the Midland League. A goal in each fixture against Chesterfield Municipal probably contributed to his joining that club for the 1920–21 season, during which he scored five goals from about 36 league matches. His next club was Worcester City, for whom he scored eight Birmingham & District League goals and one in the FA Cup in the first half of the 1921–22 season, He followed this with spells at several more clubs in the Midlands: Redditch, Oakengates Town, Tamworth Castle and Stewart Street Old Boys.

References

1899 births
Year of death missing
Footballers from Birmingham, West Midlands
English footballers
Association football inside forwards
Chesterfield F.C. players
Grimsby Town F.C. players
Worcester City F.C. players
Redditch United F.C. players
Oakengates Athletic F.C. players
Tamworth F.C. players
English Football League players
Midland Football League players